Love's Whirlpool may refer to:
 Love's Whirlpool (1924 film), an American silent crime drama film
 Love's Whirlpool (2014 film), a Japanese erotic romantic drama film